dark when the snow falls is the first album released from the band emmet swimming. The Washington Area Music Association awarded the album Best Debut Recording in 1993. The song "misgiven" was included on the Xemu Records compilation Music from the Motion Picture "Crimson Lights"

Track listing

Awards

Personnel
Todd Watts - Vocals, Guitar
Erik Wenberg - Guitar, backing vocals
James McNabb - Bass
Tamer Eid - Drums
Marco Delmar - Engineer
David Amoroso - Cover Art

References

Emmet Swimming albums
1993 albums